Anthony Charles Carter (born 31 August 1994) is an Australian professional footballer who plays as a forward for Portuguese club U.D. Oliveirense.

Club career
Carter was born in Dandenong, Victoria. He played youth football with Melbourne Phoenix and at the Genova International School of Soccer, finishing his development in Romania with CFR Cluj.

In March 2013, Carter signed a senior contract with Cluj. He made his Liga I debut for the club on 10 April 2015, as a late substitute in a 1–0 away loss against FC Universitatea Cluj; during his spell at the Stadionul Dr. Constantin Rădulescu, however, he totalled only 81 minutes in the league.

Carter then spent two seasons in the Portuguese third division with C.D. Trofense. He scored 15 goals in all competitions in the first.

On 24 January 2018, Carter joined S.L. Benfica on a four-and-a-half-year deal, being assigned to the reserves in the LigaPro. He scored his first goal as a professional on 7 April, opening the 1–1 draw at F.C. Penafiel.

On 28 June 2019, Carter moved to Académico de Viseu F.C. of the same tier on a two-year contract. The following 16 January, his 91st-minute strike helped the hosts defeat CF Canelas 2010 1–0 and qualify for the semi-finals of the Taça de Portugal.

Carter returned to his homeland in July 2022 after more than a decade, agreeing to a deal at Macarthur FC from Thai League 1 side Bangkok United FC. He scored his only goal in the A-League on 29 October, closing the 2–3 home loss against Sydney FC.

In January 2023, Carter went back to Portugal and its division two, signing with U.D. Oliveirense.

Honours
Macarthur
Australia Cup: 2022

References

External links

1994 births
Living people
People from Dandenong, Victoria
Australian soccer players
Soccer players from Melbourne
Association football forwards
Liga I players
CFR Cluj players
Liga Portugal 2 players
Campeonato de Portugal (league) players
C.D. Trofense players
S.L. Benfica B players
Académico de Viseu F.C. players
U.D. Oliveirense players
Anthony Carter
Anthony Carter
A-League Men players
Macarthur FC players
Australian expatriate soccer players
Expatriate footballers in Romania
Expatriate footballers in Portugal
Expatriate footballers in Thailand
Australian expatriate sportspeople in Romania
Australian expatriate sportspeople in Portugal
Australian expatriate sportspeople in Thailand